The Merriam Mountains are geologically composed primarily of igneous rocks formed during the Mid-Cretaceous period which began 145 Million years ago and ended 66 million years ago. The Merriam Mountain Range is home to coyotes, rabbits, rattlesnakes and a variety of common insect species. Fennel, an imported plant species native to Italy, can be found growing on some areas of the southern range.
The Merriam Mountains are a mountain range in San Diego County, California.

References 

Mountain ranges of Southern California
Mountain ranges of San Diego County, California